DnaJ homolog subfamily A member 3, mitochondrial, also known as Tumorous imaginal disc 1 (TID1), is a protein that in humans is encoded by the DNAJA3 gene on chromosome 16. This protein belongs to the DNAJ/Hsp40 protein family, which is known for binding and activating Hsp70 chaperone proteins to perform protein folding, degradation, and complex assembly. As a mitochondrial protein, it is involved in maintaining membrane potential and mitochondrial DNA (mtDNA) integrity, as well as cellular processes such as  cell movement, growth, and death. Furthermore, it is associated with a broad range of diseases, including neurodegenerative diseases, inflammatory diseases, and cancers.

Structure 
As a member of the DNAJ/Hsp40 protein family, DNAJA3 contains a conserved DnaJ domain, which includes an HPD motif that interacts with Hsp70 to perform its cochaperone function. The DnaJ domain is composed of tetrahelical regions containing a tripeptide of histidine, proline and aspartic acid situated between two helices. In addition, this protein contains a glycine/phenylalanine (G/F) rich linker region and a central cysteine-rich region similar to a zinc finger repeat, both characteristic of type I DnaJ molecular chaperones. The mitochondrial targeting sequence at its N-terminal directs the localization of the protein to the mitochondrial matrix.

DNAJA3 possesses two alternatively spliced forms: a long isoform of 43 kDa and a short isoform of 40 kDa. The long isoform contains an additional 33 residues at its C-terminal compared to the short isoform, and this region is predicted to hinder the long isoform from regulating membrane potential.

Function 
DNAJA3 is a member of the DNAJ/Hsp40 protein family, which stimulates the ATPase activity of Hsp70 chaperones and plays critical roles in protein folding, degradation, and multiprotein complex assembly. DNAJA3 localizes to the mitochondria, where it interacts with the mitochondrial Hsp70 chaperone (mtHsp70) to carry out the chaperone system. This protein is crucial for maintaining a homogeneous distribution of mitochondrial membrane potential and the integrity of mtDNA. DNAJA3 homogenizes membrane potential through regulation of complex I aggregation, though the mechanism for maintaining mtDNA remains unknown. These functions then allow DNAJA3 to mediate mitochondrial fission through DRP1 and, by extension, cellular processes such as cell movement, growth, proliferation, differentiation, senescence, and apoptosis. However, though both isoforms of DNAJA3 are involved with cell survival, they are also observed to influence two opposing outcomes. The proapoptotic long isoform induces apoptosis by stimulating cytochrome C release and caspase activation in the mitochondria, whereas the antiapoptotic short isoform prevents cytochrome C release and, thus, apoptosis. In neuromuscular junctions, only the short isoform clusters acetylcholine receptors for efficient synaptic transmission. The two isoforms also differ in their specific mitochondrial localization, which may partially account for their different functions.

Before localization to the mitochondria, DNAJA3 is transiently retained in the cytosol, where it can also interact with cytosolic proteins and possibly function to transport these proteins.

Clinical significance 

This protein is implicated in several cancers, including skin cancer, breast cancer, and colorectal cancer. It is a key player in tumor suppression through interactions with oncogenic proteins, including ErbB2 and the p53 tumor suppressor protein. Under hypoxic conditions, DNAJA3 may directly influence p53 complex assembly or modification, or indirectly ubiquitinylate p53 through ubiquitin ligases like MDM2. Moreover, both p53 and DNAJA3 must be present in the mitochondria in order to induce apoptosis in the cell. In head and neck squamous cell carcinoma (HNSCC) cancer, DNAJA3 suppresses cell proliferation, anchorage-independent growth, cell motility, and cell invasion by attenuating EGFR and, downstream the signaling pathway, AKT. Thus, treatments promoting DNAJA3 expression and function may greatly aid the elimination of tumors.

Additionally, DNAJA3 is implicated in neurodegenerative diseases like Parkinson's disease by virtue of its key roles in chaperoning mitochondrial proteins and mediating mitochondrial morphology in conjunction with mtHsp70. Another disease, psoriasis, is a chronic inflammatory skin disease that results from the absence of DNAJA3 activity, which then results in the activation of MK5, increased phosphorylation of HSP27, increased actin cytoskeleton organization, and hyperthickened skin.

Interactions 

DNAJA3 has been shown to interact with:
ErbB-2 receptor tyrosine kinase
MK5
 HSPA9
 HSPA8, 
 JAK2, and
 RASA1

References

Further reading 

Heat shock proteins